Paluzza is a comune (municipality) in the Province of Udine in the Italian region Friuli-Venezia Giulia.

Geography

Paluzza borders the following municipalities: Arta Terme, Cercivento, Comeglians, Forni Avoltri, Kötschach-Mauthen (Austria), Lesachtal (Austria),  Paularo, Ravascletto, Rigolato, Sutrio, Treppo Ligosullo.

The municipal area comprises the frazioni of Casteons, Cleulis, Englaro, Naunina, Rivo, and Timau, where a particular variant of the Southern Bavarian dialect is spoken.

Sights include the Torre Moscarda, a surviving structure of a castle (Castrum Moscardum) built here by the Patriarch of Aquileia Gregorio di Montelongo; nearby are remains of ancient Roman and  World War I  fortifications.

References